William Francis Paterson was a Scottish footballer who played as a wing half (capable of being deployed in the left or right berth), primarily  for Hamilton Academical, Motherwell and Charlton Athletic.

References

Scottish footballers
Association football wing halves
Year of birth missing
19th-century births
Year of death missing
20th-century deaths
Footballers from Hamilton, South Lanarkshire
Scottish Football League players
Scottish Junior Football Association players
English Football League players
Petershill F.C. players
Hamilton Academical F.C. players
Bo'ness F.C. players
Arbroath F.C. players
Liverpool F.C. wartime guest players
Charlton Athletic F.C. players
Bostall Heath F.C. players
Motherwell F.C. players